Alex South (born 7 January 1931) is an English former footballer who played as a defender.

References

1931 births
English footballers
Brighton & Hove Albion F.C. players
Liverpool F.C. players
Halifax Town A.F.C. players
Living people
Association football defenders